Adrian Colbert (born October 6, 1993) is an American football safety for the Chicago Bears of the National Football League (NFL). He last played for the Tennessee Titans of the National Football League (NFL). He played college football at the University of Texas and University of Miami.

High school
Colbert attended Mineral Wells High school in Mineral Wells, Texas. He was a 4-star prospect and originally committed to Texas.

College career
Colbert played at the University of Texas at Austin from 2012 to 2015. He transferred to the University of Miami for his senior year in 2016.

Professional career

San Francisco 49ers
The San Francisco 49ers selected Colbert in the seventh round (229th overall) of the 2017 NFL Draft. Colbert was the 31st cornerback drafted in 2017.

On May 4, 2017, the San Francisco 49ers signed Colbert to a four-year, $2.48 million contract that included a signing bonus of $84,786. He played in 14 games with six starts at free safety as a rookie, recording 37 tackles and five passes defensed.

Colbert entered the 2018 season as the starting free safety for the San Francisco 49ers. He played in seven games with six starts before suffering a high ankle sprain in Week 7. He was placed on injured reserve on October 22, 2018.

Colbert was waived/injured during final roster cuts on August 31, 2019, and reverted to the team's injured reserve list the next day. He was waived from injured reserve with an injury settlement on September 6.

Seattle Seahawks
On September 18, 2019, Colbert was signed to the Seattle Seahawks practice squad. He was promoted to the active roster on September 26, 2019. He was waived on October 12, 2019, and re-signed to the practice squad.

Miami Dolphins
On November 19, 2019, Colbert was signed by the Miami Dolphins off the Seattle Seahawks practice squad.

Colbert re-signed with the Miami Dolphins on March 20, 2020. He was waived on August 16, 2020.

Kansas City Chiefs
Colbert was signed by the Kansas City Chiefs on August 22, 2020. He was waived during final roster cuts on September 5, 2020.

New York Giants
On September 6, 2020, Colbert was claimed off waivers by the New York Giants. He was placed on injured reserve on November 3, 2020. On December 19, 2020, Colbert was activated off of injured reserve.

New England Patriots
On May 21, 2021, Colbert signed with the New England Patriots. On August 30, 2021, Colbert was released by the New England Patriots.

New York Jets
On September 6, 2021, Colbert was signed by the New York Jets to their practice squad. He was promoted to the active roster on September 20. On October 26, 2021, Colbert was released by the Jets.

Cleveland Browns
On December 19, 2021, Colbert was signed to the Cleveland Browns practice squad. He was elevated to the active roster as a COVID-19 replacement player on December 24, 2021.

Tennessee Titans
On August 9, 2022, Colbert signed with the Tennessee Titans. He was later released on August 29, 2022.

Chicago Bears
On November 29, 2022, Colbert was signed to the Chicago Bears practice squad. He signed a reserve/future contract on January 9, 2023.

Personal life
Colbert is a cousin of Seattle Seahawks wide receiver Marquise Goodwin.

References

1993 births
Living people
Players of American football from Texas
People from Mineral Wells, Texas
Sportspeople from the Dallas–Fort Worth metroplex
American football cornerbacks
Miami Hurricanes football players
Texas Longhorns football players
Miami Dolphins players
Seattle Seahawks players
San Francisco 49ers players
Kansas City Chiefs players
New York Giants players
New England Patriots players
New York Jets players
Cleveland Browns players
Tennessee Titans players
Chicago Bears players